Neurolysis is the application of physical or chemical agents to a nerve in order to cause a temporary degeneration of targeted nerve fibers. When the nerve fibers degenerate, it causes an interruption in the transmission of nerve signals. In the medical field, this is most commonly and advantageously used to alleviate pain in cancer patients.

The different types of neurolysis include celiac plexus neurolysis, endoscopic ultrasound guided neurolysis, and lumbar sympathetic neurolysis. Chemodenervation and nerve blocks are also associated with neurolysis.

Additionally, there is external neurolysis. Peripheral nerves move (glide) across bones and muscles. A peripheral nerve can be trapped by scarring of surrounding tissue which may lead to potential nerve damage or pain. An external neurolysis is when scar tissue is removed from around the nerve without entering the nerve itself.

Background
Neurolysis is a chemical ablation technique that is used to alleviate pain. Neurolysis is only used when the disease has progressed to a point where no other pain treatments are effective. A neurolytic agent such as alcohol, phenol, or glycerol is typically injected into the nervous system. Chemical neurolysis causes deconstructive fibrosis which then disrupts the sympathetic ganglia. This results in a reduction of pain signals being transmitted throughout the nerves. The effects generally last for three to six months.

Certain neurolysis techniques have been reported to be used in the early 1900s for the treatment of pain by the neurologist Mathieu Jaboulay. Early reported neurolysis helped treat vasospastic disorders such as arterial occlusive disease before the introduction of endovascular procedures.

Types

Celiac plexus neurolysis
Celiac plexus neurolysis (CPN) is the chemical ablation of the celiac plexus. This type of neurolysis is mainly used to treat pain associated with advanced pancreatic cancer. Traditional opioid medications used to treat pancreatic cancer patients may yield inadequate pain relief in the most advanced stages of pancreatic cancer, so the goal of CPN is to increase the efficiency of the medication. This in turn may lead to a decreased dosage, thereby decreasing the severity of the side effects. CPN is also used to decrease the chances of a patient developing an addiction for opioid medications due to the large doses commonly used in treatment.

Traditional CPN approaches and nerve blocks
CPN can be performed by percutaneous injection either anterior or posterior to the celiac plexus. CPN is generally performed complementary to nerve blocks, due to the severe pain associated with the injection itself. Neurolysis is commonly performed only after a successful celiac plexus block. CPN and celiac plexus block (CPB) are different in that CPN is permanent ablation whereas CPB is temporal pain inhibition.

There are multiple posterior percutaneous approaches, but no clinical evidence suggests that any one technique is more efficient than the rest. The posterior approaches generally utilize two needles, one at each side of the L1 vertebral body pointing towards the T12 vertebral body.

Increasing the spread of the injection may increase the efficacy of the neurolysis.

Endoscopic ultrasound-guided neurolysis
Endoscopic ultrasound (EUS)-guided neurolysis is a technique that performs neurolysis using a linear-array echoendoscope. The EUS technique is minimally invasive and is believed to be safer than the traditional percutaneous approaches. EUS-guided neurolysis technique can be used to target the celiac plexus, the celiac ganglion, or the broad plexus in the treatment of pancreatic cancer-associated pain.

EUS-guided celiac plexus neurolysis (EUS-CPN) is performed with either an oblique-viewing or forward-viewing echoendoscope and is passed through the mouth into the esophagus. From the gastroesophageal junction, EUS imaging allows the doctor to visualize the aorta, which can then be traced to the origin of the celiac artery. The celiac plexus itself cannot be identified, but is located relative to the celiac artery. The neurolysis is then performed with a spray needle that disperses a neurolytic agent, such as alcohol or phenol, into the celiac plexus.

EUS-CPN can be performed unilaterally (centrally) or bilaterally, however, there is no clinical evidence supporting the superiority of one over the other.

EUS-guided neurolysis can also be performed on the celiac ganglion and the broad plexus in a similar fashion to the EUS-CPN. The celiac ganglion neurolysis (EUS-CGN) is more effective than EUS-CPN and broad plexus neurolysis (EUS-BPN) is more effective than EUS-CGN.

Lumbar sympathetic neurolysis
Lumbar sympathetic neurolysis is typically used on patients with ischemic rest pain, generally associated with nonreconstructable arterial occlusive disease. Although the disease is the basis for this type of neurolysis, other diseases such as peripheral neuralgia or vasospastic disorders can receive lumbar sympathetic neurolysis for pain treatment.

Lumbar sympathetic neurolysis is performed between the L1-L4 vertebrae with separate injections at each vertebra junction. The chemicals used for neurolysis of the nerves cause destructive fibrosis and cause a disruption of the sympathetic ganglia. The vasomotor tone is decreased in the area affected by the neurolysis, which in addition to arteriovenous shunting, create a light pink appearance within the affected area. Lumbar sympathetic neurolysis alters the ischemic rest pain transmission by changing norepinephrine and catecholamine levels or by disturbing afferent fibers. This procedure is mainly used only when other feasible approaches to pain management are unable to be used.

Lumbar sympathetic neurolysis is performed by using absolute alcohol, but other chemicals such as phenol, or other techniques such as radiofrequency or laser ablation have been studied. To aid in the procedure, fluoroscopy or CT guidance is used. Fluoroscopic guidance is the most frequent, giving better real-time monitoring of the needle. The general technique of administering lumbar sympathetic neurolysis involves using three separate needles rather than one because it allows for better longitudinal spread of the chemicals.

Complications can arise from this procedure such as nerve root injury, bleeding, paralysis, and more. Complications have been seen to be diminished when using the aforementioned radiofrequency or laser ablation techniques in comparison to the injection of alcohol or phenol. Generally, approximately two-thirds of patients can expect a favorable outcome (pain relief with minimal complications). Overall, the minimally invasive technique of lumbar sympathetic neurolysis is important in the relief of ischemic rest pain.

Chemodenervation
Chemodenervation is a process used to manage focal muscle overactivity through the use of either phenol, alcohol, or one of the more recently discovered botulinum toxins (BoNTs). Chemodenervation is used as a complement to neurolysis. The agent of choice is injected into the muscle fibers as opposed to nerve tissue and the two work together to dull the neuronal signaling within the muscles.

The effects of alcohol and phenol injections are different from the effects of BoNTs. Neurolysis mediates the effects of alcohol and phenol injections but does not mediate the effects of BoNT injections. Phenol and alcohol are less expensive, faster acting, can treat larger areas, and can be re-administered or boosted in less than three months, however, those injections also require the patient to be sedated, cause muscle scarring, and can lead to muscle fibrosis. BoNT injections are easier to inject, better accepted by patients, and have reversible effects on muscles, however, they are more expensive, act very slowly, and the body can develop a resistance to them.

References

Materials degradation
Nerves
Neurosurgery